Scandinavian Braille is a braille alphabet used, with differences in orthography and punctuation, for the languages of the mainland Nordic countries: Danish, Norwegian, Swedish, and Finnish. In a generally reduced form it is used for Greenlandic.

Scandinavian Braille is very close to French Braille, with slight modification of some of the accented letters, and optional use of the others to transcribe foreign languages.

Alphabet

The braille letters for the French print vowels â, œ, ä are used for the print vowels å, ö/ø, ä/æ of the Scandinavian alphabets. Each language uses the letters that exists in its inkprint alphabet.  Thus, in numerical order, the letters are:

{| class="wikitable" style="line-height: 1.2"
|- align=center
|  a
|  b
|  c
|  d
|  e
|  f
|  g
|  h
|  i
|  j
|- align=center
|  k
|  l
|  m
|  n
|  o
|  p
|  q
|  r
|  s
|  t
|- align=center
|  u
|  v
|  x
|  y
|  z
|  å
|  ö/ø
|  w
|  ä/æ
|  &
|}

Greenlandic Braille uses a subset of these letters, a e f g i j k l m n o p q r s t u v, though the rest of the Scandinavian alphabet is available when needed.

For foreign accented letters, French Braille assignments are used.

Numbers

Punctuation
Punctuation differs slightly between each country, but this is unlikely to impede understanding.

Single punctuation

The ellipsis  is thus .

Finnish  ! is not a copy error.  It is the reverse of the  found in all other Nordic countries, though the latter is the + sign in Finnish mathematical notation just as it is in those other countries.  Finnish punctuation is used for Swedish text in Finland.

Paired punctuation

At least in Norwegian Braille, the braces { ... } are ....

Formatting
Given the poor coverage, it is not clear how compatible formatting is between countries. (See Estonian Braille for formatting in an orthography with similar punctuation to Finnish and Swedish.)

Also in Swedish (and perhaps the others), the auxiliary parentheses  ...  are used to add comments that appear only in the braille text, such as a description of a picture in the print text being transcribed.

See also

Estonian Braille
Faroese Braille
Icelandic Braille
Northern Sami Braille (Norway)
 Moon type is a simplification of the Latin alphabet for embossing. An adaptation for Danish- and Swedish-reading blind people has been proposed.

References
Punktskriftsalfabet  (Braille alphabet in Swedish)

Sjondepilin.fo "Tá tú hittir blind fólk" (Braille alphabet in Faroese) 
Íslenska blindraleturs stafrófið (Braille alphabet in Icelandic)

External links
Håndbok i litterær punktskrift ("Manual of literary Braille", in Norwegian)
Kortskrift i norsk punktskrift, KS04 (abbreviations in Norwegian Braille, in Norwegian)
Svenska skrivregler för punktskrift ("Swedish writing-rules for Braille", in Swedish)

French-ordered braille alphabets